Lower Nimpkish Provincial Park is a provincial park in British Columbia, Canada, located on the lower Nimpkish River. It is an undeveloped wilderness park that seeks to preserve the habitat while offering fishing and nature appreciation opportunities to the public.

See also 
 Nimpkish Lake Provincial Park

References 

Provincial parks of British Columbia
Northern Vancouver Island
Year of establishment missing